Baimai (Chinese: 八美; Pinyin: Bāměi) is a Township in Lhorong County, Qamdo Prefecture in the eastern Tibet Autonomous Region of the People's Republic of China.

The population is around 590.

Sight

Bamei Town is situated in southeast of Daofu County of Garze Qiang and Tibetan Autonomous Prefecture of Sichuan Province. 

The town is noted for nearby grassland, towering snow mountains and the charming Tibetan houses.

See also
List of towns and villages in Tibet Autonomous Region

Populated places in Chamdo